The 2019 Rugby League World Cup 9s was an international rugby league tournament played in the rugby league nines format, to be held in Australia on 18 and 19 October 2019. Twelve national teams competed, with four of those also fielding women's teams. The squads consisted of 16 players.

Players' positions are listed as either backs (BK) or forwards (FW). Their age is given as of the tournament's opening day, 18 October 2019.

Pool A

Australia
Coach:  Mal Meninga

Australia named their 16-man squad on 7 October 2019. Cody Walker and Curtis Scott were originally named, but withdrew. They were replaced by Daly Cherry-Evans and Campbell Graham respectively.

New Zealand
Coach:  Michael Maguire

New Zealand named their 16-man squad on 9 October 2019. James Fisher-Harris and Jordan Rapana were originally named, but withdrew and were replaced by Zane Tetevano and Charnze Nicoll-Klokstad respectively. Braden Hamlin-Uele was ruled out after the final squads had been finalised. Adam Blair was brought in as a late replacement.

Papua New Guinea
Coach:  Michael Marum

PNG named their 16-man squad on 1 October 2019. James Segeyaro and Lachlan Lam were originally named, but were replaced by Moses Meninga and Wartovo Puara.

United States
Coach:  Sean Rutgerson

The United States named a 20-man training squad on 3 September 2019. The final 16-man squad was announced on 10 October 2019.

Pool B

England
Coach:  Wayne Bennett

England named their 16-man squad on 6 October 2019. Jack Hughes was originally named, but withdrew due to injury. He was replaced by Blake Austin.

France
Coach:  Aurélien Cologni

France named a 17-man squad on 2 October 2019. Lilian Albert was originally named but withdrew.

Lebanon
Coach:  Rick Stone

Lebanon named their 16-man squad on 10 October 2019. Anthony Layoun was originally named but was replaced by Jordan Samrani. Jacob Kiraz and Jordan Samrani were ruled ineligible to participate due to being under the age of 18. Kiraz took the field against France, however.

Wales
Coach:  John Kear

Wales named a 23-man training squad on 16 September. The final 16-man squad was announced on 9 October 2019.

Pool C

Cook Islands
Coach:  Tony Iro

Fiji
Coach:  Brandon Costin

Fiji named their 16-man squad on 10 October 2019. Mikaele Ravalawa was originally named but was replaced by Semi Valemei.

Samoa
Coach:  Matt Parish

Samoa named their 16-man squad on 10 October 2019.

Tonga
Coach:  David Tangata-Toa

Tonga named their 16-man squad on 11 October 2019. Included in the squad was two players named "Sione Katoa" - Sione Katoa (born 1997; a er) and Sione Katoa (born 1995; a ). The latter is referred to by his full name, Sione Utia-Katoa, for clarity.

Women

Australia
Coach:  Brad Donald

Australia named their 17-person squad on 7 October 2019. Brittany Breayley and Tamika Upton were originally named but withdrew and were replaced by Tarryn Aiken.

England

Coach:  Craig Richards

England women's squad was named on 2 August 2019. Shannon Lacey was ruled out by injury, and was replaced by Georgia Wilson.

New Zealand
Coach:  Justin Morgan

New Zealand women's squad was named on 9 October. Lavinia Gould was originally named but was replaced by Kanyon Paul.

Papua New Guinea
Coach:  Bagelo Solien

Papua New Guinea women's squad was named on 1 October. Shae-Yvonne De La Cruz and Veronica Waula were originally named but were replaced by Gloria Kaupa and Mellisa Peters. Sera Koroi and Joyce Waula were ruled ineligible to participate due to being under the age of 18.

References

Rugby League World Cup squads
Rugby League World Cup 9s